Neurobiology of Learning and Memory is a bimonthly peer-reviewed scientific journal covering neuroscience as it pertains to the processes of learning and memory. It was established in 1968 as Communications in Behavioral Biology Part A. It was renamed 
to Behavioral Biology in 1972, to Behavioral and Neural Biology in 1979, and to its current title in 1995. It is published by Elsevier and the editor-in-chief is Ted Abel (University of Iowa). According to the Journal Citation Reports, the journal has a 2017 impact factor of 3.244.

References

External links

Neuroscience journals
Elsevier academic journals
Publications established in 1968
Bimonthly journals
English-language journals